Mikhail Dmitriyevich Tebenkov (also Tebenkof; 1802 – April 3, 1872) was a Russian hydrographer and vice admiral of the Imperial Russian Navy. From 1845 to 1850, he served as director of the Russian American Company and the governor of Russian America.

He is especially noted for having surveyed and mapped the still little-known coast of Alaska. His Atlas of the Northwest Coasts of America: from Bering Strait to Cape Corrientes and the Aleutian Islands was published in 1852 and contained 39 engraved maps.

Career

In 1821, Mikhail Tebenkov graduated from the Naval Cadet Corps School. For the next three years, he served on different ships in the Baltic Sea. In 1824, Tebenkov was put in charge of logging for shipbuilding purposes near Narva.

In January 1825, he joined the Russian American Company, which led colonizing and trade efforts in North America. He would later command the company-owned brigantines Golovnin, Ryurik, Chichagov, and a sloop named Urup in 1826–1834.
 
Tebenkov surveyed Norton Sound on behalf of the Imperial Russian Hydrographic Service in 1831 and was the first European to sight the bay that now bears his name. He surveyed Tebenkof Bay in 1833 before returning to St. Petersburg.

In 1835 Tebenkov sailed from Cronstadt back to Alaska via Cape Horn as commander of the Russian American Company's ship Elena. He arrived in Sitka in April 1836. Between 1845 and 1850, Tebenkov served as the director of the Russian American Company and the governor of Russian America.

Tebenkov was perhaps the most outstanding Russian surveyor of the time, dedicating much time and patient work to the improvement of charts of the Alaskan coast.

Legacy
Trebenkov's noted Atlas of the Northwest Coasts of America: from Bering Strait to Cape Corrientes and the Aleutian Islands was published in 1852. The 39 maps of this atlas were engraved at Sitka around 1849 by Kozma Terentev (or Terentief), an Alaskan-Russian creole man.

Besides Tebenkof Bay, other geographic features of Alaska, including Tebenkof Glacier, Mount Tebenkof and Point Tebenkof were named after Captain Mikhail Tebenkov.

Works
Atlas sieverozapadnykh beregov Ameriki. Sitka (1872).
Gidrograficheskiia zamiechaniia k Atlasu sieverozapadnykh beregov Ameriki. Sitka (1872).

References

External links
Atlas, images

1802 births
1872 deaths
Imperial Russian Navy admirals
Bering Sea
Governors of the Russian-American Company
Russian and Soviet polar explorers
Explorers from the Russian Empire
Explorers of Asia
Explorers of Alaska
Russian explorers of North America